Herman Vilhelm "Ville" Mattila (March 9, 1903 – July 11, 1987) was a Finnish cross-country skier who competed in the 1928 Winter Olympics.

He was born and died in Haapavesi.

In 1928 he finished tenth in the 18 kilometre competition.

Cross-country skiing results

Olympic Games

External links
 profile

1903 births
1987 deaths
People from Haapavesi
Finnish male cross-country skiers
Olympic cross-country skiers of Finland
Military patrol competitors at the 1924 Winter Olympics
Cross-country skiers at the 1928 Winter Olympics
Olympic silver medalists for Finland
Sportspeople from North Ostrobothnia
20th-century Finnish people